Parapoxvirus is a genus of viruses, in the family Poxviridae, in the subfamily Chordopoxvirinae. Like all members of the family Poxviridae, they are oval, relatively large, double-stranded DNA viruses. Parapoxviruses have a unique spiral coat that distinguishes them from other poxviruses. Parapoxviruses infect vertebrates, including a wide selection of mammals, and humans.

Not all parapoxviruses are zoonotic.  Notable zoonotic hosts of parapoxviruses include sheep, goats, and cattle.

The most recent species of parapoxviruses has been found in New Zealand red deer.  There are also some tentative species in the genus, including Auzduk disease virus, Chamois contagious ecthyma virus, and sealpox virus.

Structure
Viruses in Parapoxvirus are enveloped, with ovoid geometries. These viruses are about 140–170 nm wide and 220–300 nm long, and have a regular surface structure; tubules with a diameter of 10–20 nm form a criss-cross pattern. Genomes are linear, around 130–150kb in length.

Life cycle
Viral replication is cytoplasmic. Entry into the host cell is achieved by attachment of the viral proteins to host glycosaminoglycans (GAGs) mediates endocytosis of the virus into the host cell. Fusion with the plasma membrane to release the core into the host cytoplasm. Early phase: early genes are transcribed in the cytoplasm by viral RNA polymerase. Early expression begins at 30 minutes post-infection. Core is completely uncoated as early expression ends, viral genome is now free in the cytoplasm. Intermediate phase: Intermediate genes are expressed, triggering genomic DNA replication at approximately 100 minutes post-infection. Late phase: Late genes are expressed from 140 min to 48 hours post-infection, producing all structural proteins. Assembly of progeny virions starts in cytoplasmic viral factories, producing a spherical immature particle. This virus particle matures into brick-shaped intracellular mature virion (IMV). The IMV can be released upon cell lysis, or can acquire a second double membrane from trans-Golgi and bud as external enveloped virion (EEV) host receptors, which mediates endocytosis. Replication follows the DNA strand displacement model. DNA-templated transcription is the method of transcription. The virus exits the host cell by existing in occlusion bodies after cell death and remaining infectious until finding another host. Humans and mammals serve as the natural hosts. Transmission routes are zoonosis and contact.

Taxonomy
The genus contains the following species:
 Bovine papular stomatitis virus
 Grey sealpox virus
 Orf virus
 Pseudocowpox virus
 Red deerpox virus

Impact
Parapoxviruses cause infection of cows, sheep, goats, and red squirrels worldwide. They tend to cause lesions that range in size depending on the case. Between 1990 and 1995, there was a mean of 15 cases reported annually. This is a significant decline from the annual mean of 46 cases between 1968 and 1978.

Some authors believe that the infection is much more common than reported, as it may not appear to be a serious infection.

Seasonal fluctuations
Most reports indicate a higher frequency of human infections during the spring and autumn, presumably due to the seasonal slaughtering of susceptible animals.  However, others show a higher occurrence in winter.  This may be attributed to the use of gorse, an animal feed that may cause trauma, thereby leading to infection.

See also
 Sealpox virus

References

External links
 Viralzone: Parapoxvirus
 ICTV
 Virus Pathogen Database and Analysis Resource (ViPR): Poxviridae

Chordopoxvirinae
Virus genera